The only participation of Trinidad and Tobago in the final stages of the FIFA World Cup came in 2006, when they qualified for the tournament in Germany, but failed to win any match and were eliminated at the group stage.  Trinidad and Tobago became the smallest nation in terms of population to reach the finals of a World Cup tournament, a feat previously held by Northern Ireland since their first World Cup appearance at the 1958 World Cup.  This record was held until Iceland qualified for the first time in 2018.

Qualification
On 12 October 2005, Trinidad and Tobago secured fourth place in the CONCACAF final qualification round, and therefore participated in a playoff with the fifth place Asian team Bahrain for a chance to enter the 2006 World Cup. After a 1–1 draw in Port of Spain, the team beat Bahrain 1–0, with a Dennis Lawrence header in Manama, to clinch their first ever qualification for the World Cup finals.

Squad

 

Silvio Spann was originally in the squad, but had to drop-out after sustaining a hamstring injury in the run-up to the tournament. He was replaced by Evans Wise.
Head coach of Trinidad and Tobago's 2006 World Cup squad was Leo Beenhakker.

Finals Matches
Trinidad and Tobago were drawn in Group B along with England, Sweden, and Paraguay.

In their first match, Trinidad and Tobago held a strong Swedish side to a 0–0 draw, despite having Avery John sent off less than 30 seconds into the second half. Team captain Dwight Yorke won Man of the Match honours.

Trinidad and Tobago lost their second game of the group stage to England 2–0. Late goals from Peter Crouch and Steven Gerrard secured England a place in the second round.
Trinidad and Tobago had hoped for a draw between Paraguay and Sweden for their best chances of getting second place but Sweden defeated Paraguay 1–0.

Trinidad and Tobago lost their third and final game of Group B to Paraguay 2–0.  An own goal from Brent Sancho put them behind early in the game, and Paraguay scored a second goal late in the match from Nelson Cuevas.

Trinidad and Tobago finished last in Group B with one point, and were eliminated from the 2006 World Cup. They were the only team in the 2006 World Cup not to score a goal.

Group B

Support
The Tartan Army, supporters of Scottish football, lent their support to Trinidad and Tobago, partly since they were opponents to England and in part six of the squad members played for Scottish clubs.

Aftermath
On their return from Germany, the government awarded Leo Beenhakker and each member of the squad the country's second highest honour, the Chaconia Medal, Gold, plus TT$1,000,000 (one quarter in cash, the rest in unit trusts). As captain, Dwight Yorke was awarded TT$1,250,000, while players who had participated in qualification but not in Germany were awarded TT$250,000. Ten members of the teams' technical staff were also later awarded TT$250,000.

On 6 October 2006, thirteen of the players in the 2006 World Cup squad indicated their intention to retire from international football after friendly matches against St. Vincent and the Grenadines and Panama on 7 October and 11 October, respectively. The players alleged that the Trinidad and Tobago Football Federation had reneged on various contractual commitments to the team.  This was upheld by the Trinidadian High Court in March 2011, who ordered that an interim payment of $1.14m should be made.

References

External links
Trinadad and Tobago at the 2006 World Cup BBC Page

 
Countries at the 2006 FIFA World Cup
World Cup